12th meridian may refer to:

12th meridian east, a line of longitude east of the Greenwich Meridian
12th meridian west, a line of longitude west of the Greenwich Meridian